Jeremy Guilbaut (born 2 June 1980) is a Canadian actor. He most recently appeared in the television series The Guard and also appeared in Edgemont. His other credits include Battlestar Galactica and Millennium. He is often seen in movies associated with the Hallmark Channel and its subsidiary Hallmark Movies & Mysteries Channel and was recently seen in the 2019 movie The Last Bridesmaid.

Filmography

Film

Television

References

External links

1980 births
Living people
Canadian male film actors
Canadian male television actors
Canadian people of French descent
Place of birth missing (living people)